The Central General de Trabajadores (CGT) is a trade union centre in the Dominican Republic.  It is affiliated with the International Trade Union Confederation.

References

Trade unions in the Dominican Republic
International Trade Union Confederation